George Duncan McKenzie (27 January 1908 – 1974) was a Scottish amateur football outside left who made over 100 appearances in the Scottish League for Queen's Park. He represented Scotland at amateur level and also played club football in England.

Personal life 
McKenzie attended Aberdeen University and worked as a doctor.

References

Scottish footballers
Scottish Football League players
Queen's Park F.C. players
Place of death missing
1974 deaths
Association football outside forwards
1908 births
People from Buckie
Scotland amateur international footballers
Buckie Thistle F.C. players
Hull City A.F.C. players
Stockport County F.C. players
Macclesfield Town F.C. players
English Football League players
Alumni of the University of Aberdeen
Sportspeople from Moray